Sigurd Winge (born March 14, 1909, in Hamburg, Germany, died January 22, 1970, in Trondheim)

was a Norwegian visual artist, best known as a graphic artist and for his monumental art.His father, Johan Ernst Winge (1858-1949), was a city architect in Hamburg, from where the family moved to Oslo (Kristiania)in 1917.He studied at the Academy of fine arts under Axel Revold from 1929 to 1932. 

In 1933 he made his debut at the exhibition of 11 young painters in the Artists' Association in Oslo, and the same year he was also represented at the Høstutstillingen. It was also in 1933 that he met Rolf Nesch who had a great influence on his art.Winge was admitted to the World's Fairs in Paris in 1937 and in New York in 1939, where he made a thirty meter long frieze with fishing boats. 

Other exhibitions with his art include the National Museum of Art, Architecture and Design (Nasjonalgalleriet) in 1956, 1965 and 1978, Bergen Picture Gallery 1959.He made decorations in, among other things, the mosaic frieze at Oslo Commerce School, 1948-56, which was the inspiration for Rolf Nesch 's Herring Fishing from 1965. Winge also made the foundation wall in Østre Krematorium Great Chapel 1957-68.

Winge became a professor at the Norwegian National Academy of Fine Arts, in 1969. At the same time, he worked on the staging of Antigone at Trøndelag Teater, together with his son, Stein Winge. He designed the costumes and had the scenography. Father and son were looking forward to this first major professional collaboration, which they had now implemented. 

Unfortunately, they did not work together a long time. Sigurd Winge, died suddenly, at Hotel Britannia in Trondheim 22.01.1970, in the arms of his son, Stein Winge. 

The funeral took place, 02.02.1970, in Østre Krematorium, where he had worked for 11 years with the decoration "The Resurrection"

Some of the plans of Sigurd Winge the same year: A mission to Bergen, one mosaic was planned as a gift to the 900 year jubilee, in the street body on Torgallmenningen.

At the Norwegian National Academy of Fine Arts, he was supposed to create a material class, which was something completely new at the academy.

The Ministry of Foreign Affairs (Norway), had invited Sigurd Winge to create an exhibition in Germany in the autumn of 1970.

References

1909 births
1970 deaths
20th-century Norwegian painters
Mosaic artists